Kobi Oshrat (born July 15, 1944) is an Israeli    composer and conductor. He composed and conducted the winning entry at the 1979 Eurovision Song Contest Hallelujah sung by the vocal ensemble Milk and Honey.

Biography
Yaakov (Kobi) Ventura (later Kobi Oshrat) was born in Haifa to parents who had immigrated from Salonika.  After an early career on the Israeli stage, in 1969 he began composing and arranging music for radio, TV, film and advertisements. Oshrat achieved international fame when his composition, Hallelujah, sung by the Israeli group Milk and Honey, won the 1979 Eurovision Song Contest. Oshrat has written more than 1000 songs, but Hallelujah is his most famous, with 400 cover versions of it around the world.

Oshrat also composed and conducted the 1985 and 1992 Israeli entries. He conducted the 1987 and 1991 Israeli entries but did not write the music for them.

See also
Music of Israel

References

External links
 http://www.hebrewsongs.com/artist.asp?name=kobioshrat

1944 births
Living people
Israeli composers
Eurovision Song Contest winners
People from Haifa
Eurovision Song Contest conductors
21st-century conductors (music)
Israeli people of Greek-Jewish descent